This is a list of winners of the Best Actor award from the Australian Academy of Cinema and Television Arts Awards (AACTA Awards).
 Ray Barrett
 Simon Burke
 Russell Crowe
 Colin Friels
 Mel Gibson
 John Hargreaves
 Chris Haywood
 Bill Hunter
 Norman Kaye
 Leo McKern
 John Meillon
 Sam Neill
 Richard Roxburgh
 Geoffrey Rush
 Bruce Spence
 Max von Sydow
 Nick Tate
 Jack Thompson
 John Waters
 Hugo Weaving

References

 
AACTA, Best Actor